

Biology 

 Phorbas (sponge): Genus of sponge

Mythology 

 Phorbas: Name of several characters in Greek mythology